Michael Vasileiou was a Greek 19th-century merchant and benefactor. He was born in Gjirokastër, Ottoman Empire at the time, in modern Albania.

He was the brother of Alexandros Vasileiou, merchant, scholar and student of Adamantios Korais, a major figure of the Greek Enlightenment movement. Michael Vasileiou ran his trade business in Constantinople (modern Istanbul), where he lived most of his life and succeeded in becoming one of the most successful businessmen among the members of the Greek community in the Ottoman capital.

He supported financially several issues of the Hermes o Logios literary newspaper, published in Vienna as well the Greek translation of the French codex for merchants (in 1817).

Two of his daughters (Efrosyni and Smaragda) married members of the Mellas family, which was also financially strong in the local Greek community of that time.

References

Vasileiou Michael
Vasileiou Michael
Year of death missing
Year of birth missing